Hāna is a census-designated place (CDP) in Maui County, Hawaii, United States. The population was 1,526 at the 2020 census. Hana is located at the eastern end of the island of Maui and is one of the most isolated communities in the state.  It is reached mainly via the Hāna Highway, a long, winding,  highway along Maui's northern shore, via boat, and with commercial air service to Hāna airport.

History

Like most of Hawaii, Hāna was probably first settled between 500 and 800 AD by Polynesian peoples.

The first sugarcane plantation in the area was established by George Wilfong in 1849, and by 1883 there were six plantations operating in the area. By 1946, however, the last sugarcane plantation had closed, leading plantation workers to move mostly to the west side of Maui. That same year saw the opening of the Kauiki Inn, later known as the Hotel Travaasa – Hāna and today as the Hyatt Hāna-Maui Resort, which helped transition the economy towards tourism.

The winding, famously scenic Hāna Highway was completed in 1926.  Originally paved with gravel, it provided the first land vehicle access to the town. Hāna's population peaked in the first half of the twentieth century, with a population of about 3,500.

Geography and climate
Hāna is located at  (20.770017, −155.994179), directly on the East rift zone of East Maui Volcano (Haleakalā). The Hāna Airport offers flights with regular service to the Big Island, Kahului, and Oahu.

Near Hāna are natural areas and several swimming holes in the Haleakalā National Park.

Hāna's climate is hot and wet year round, typical of a tropical rainforest.

Demographics

As of the census of 2010, Hāna had 1,235 residents, 390 households, and 252 families residing in the CDP.  The 2010 population density was 105.6 people per square mile (40.8 people per square kilometer).  There were 506 housing units at an average density of 48.2/sq mi.  The racial makeup of the CDP was 22.2% White, 0.1% African American, 0.1% American Indian and Alaska Native, 5.0% Asian, 29.1% Pacific Islander, 0.8% from some other race, and 42.8% from two or more races. Hispanic or Latino of any race were 9.8% of the population.

As of 2010, there were 390 households, out of which 23.8% had children under the age of 18 living with them, 45.6% were headed by married couples living together, 9.7% had a female householder with no husband present, and 35.4% were non-families. 29.5% of all households were made up of individuals, and 9.7% were someone living alone who was 65 years of age or older.  The average household size was 3.17, and the average family size was 3.99.

As of 2010, in the CDP the population was spread out, with 27.8% under the age of 18, 8.5% from 18 to 24, 24.3% from 25 to 44, 25.7% from 45 to 64, and 13.5% who were 65 years of age or older.  The median age was 35.2 years. For every 100 females, there were 105.5 males.  For every 100 females age 18 and over, there were 111.9 males.

As of 2000, the median income for a household in the CDP was $50,833, and the median income for a family was $54,167. Males had a median income of $26,146 versus $22,969 for females. The per capita income for the CDP was $14,672.  About 5.6% of families and 8.6% of the population were below the poverty line, including 10.4% of those under age 18 and 3.8% of those age 65 or over.

Points of interest 

Pi'i-lani Temple – constructed in the 15th century, this is the largest temple in Hawaii
 Kahanu Garden
 Kaia Ranch Tropical Botanical Gardens
 Hāna Beach Park
 Hāna Ball Park
 Pailoa Bay
 Hamoa Beach
 Waianapanapa State Park
 Hasegawa General Store

Popular culture
Hāna's surfing culture was profiled by writer Susan Orlean in Outside magazine in 1998, inspiring the 2002 film Blue Crush.

Health care
Although not technically a hospital or emergency room, Hāna Health Clinic (or Hāna Medical Center), works in cooperation with American Medical Response and Maui Memorial Medical Center to stabilize and transport patients with emergent medical conditions. It is open 24/7 for urgent care and emergency access. The facility also offers routine physical exams, acute care, chronic disease management (heart disease, diabetes, asthma), cancer screening (Pap smears, mammograms, prostate and colon), routine gynecology, family planning services, basic laboratory and x-ray, on-site medication dispensary, and referrals for specialty care.

Economy
Major employers in Hāna include the Hāna Maui hotel, Hāna High and Elementary School, and Waiʻanapanapa State Park.

Notable residents
 Queen Kaʻahumanu, born in Hāna in 1768
 Charles Lindbergh, retired there in the 1970s and was buried near Hāna in 1974
 Pat Benatar, married to Neil Giraldo in Hāna in 1982, has houses in Hāna and in California.
 George Harrison and his wife Olivia Harrison had a property in Hāna. Harrison wrote the song Soft-Hearted Hāna about time spent in Hawaii.
 Frank Herbert, the science fiction author, moved to Hāna in 1980, toward the end of his life.

Gallery

References

External links

 Hana Tour

Populated places on Maui
Census-designated places in Maui County, Hawaii
Populated coastal places in Hawaii